Guanine nucleotide-binding protein G(I)/G(S)/G(O) subunit gamma-3 is a protein that in humans is encoded by the GNG3 gene.

G proteins are heterotrimers of alpha, beta, and gamma subunits. Gamma subunits, such as GNG3, contribute to the specificity of the hundreds of receptor signaling pathways involving G proteins (Schwindinger et al., 2004).[supplied by OMIM]

References

Further reading